The Roman Catholic Diocese of Prizren and Prishtina is an ecclesiastical territory or Diocese of the Roman Catholic Church in Kosovo. It is centred in the city of Prizren. It was erected as an Apostolic Administration in 2000, after being split from the Diocese of Skopje and Prizren and elevated in rank of Diocese in 2018.

First Apostolic Administrator of Prizren was titular bishop Marko Sopi of Celerina, who served from 2000 to 2006. He was succeeded by former bishop Dodë Gjergji of Sapë, who served as Apostolic Administrator of Prizren and currently serves as the first diocesan bishop.

History
Modern Apostolic Administration of Prizren covers the approximate territory of the former Roman Catholic Diocese of Prizren that was a titular see known as Prisriana. During the later period of Ottoman rule in 19th century there were several initiatives for organization of a regular diocese. In 1912, region of Prizren came under the rule of Kingdom of Serbia. In order to regulate status of Catholic Church, government of Serbia concluded official agreement (concordat) with the Holy See on 24 June 1914. By the Second Article of Concordat, it was decided that Diocese of Skopje shall be created as a regular diocese for all newly annexed regions (including Prizren), and it was also agreed that it would be placed under jurisdiction of Roman Catholic Archdiocese of Belgrade that was about to be created. Because of the breakout of First World War, those provisions could not be fully implemented, and only after 1918 new arrangements were made.
 
During the time of first Yugoslavia (1918-1941), there were some new initiatives towards the creation of a local diocese in Prizren. During the Second World War, the last titular bishop of Prisriana was appointed in 1942 (Ivan Romanoff), but he never came to Prizren. Only in 1969, the name of Prizren Diocese was joined with the name of the Skopje Diocese, thus creating Roman Catholic Diocese of Skopje and Prizren. In 2000, jurisdictions were split, and the portion in Kosovo became the Apostolic Administration of Prizren, while the Diocese of Skopje returned to its former name.

On September 5, 2018, the Apostolic Administration was elevated in the rank of Diocese, but remained as an Immediately Subject to the Holy See.

See also
 Catholic Church in Kosovo
 Roman Catholic Diocese of Skopje

Notes

References

External links
 Catholic Hierarchy: Apostolic Administration of Prizren
 GCatholic.org: Apostolic Administration of Prizren

Catholic Church in Kosovo
Culture in Prizren